Feminist political theory is an area of philosophy that focuses on understanding and critiquing the way political philosophy is usually construed and on articulating how political theory might be reconstructed in a way that advances feminist concerns. Feminist political theory combines aspects of both feminist theory and political theory in order to take a feminist approach to traditional questions within political philosophy.

The three main goals of the feminist political theory:
 To understand and critique the role of gender in how political theory is conventionally construed.
 To re-frame and re-articulate conventional political theory in light of feminist issues (especially gender equality).
 To support political science presuming and pursuing gender equality.

Background Information 
Feminist political philosophy is an area of philosophy that focuses on understanding and critiquing the way political philosophy is usually construed and on articulating how political theory might be reconstructed in a way that advances feminist concerns. Feminist political theory combines aspects of both feminist theory and political theory in order to take a feminist approach to traditional questions within political philosophy.

Feminist political theory is not just about women or gender. There are no strict necessary and sufficient conditions for being ‘feminist’, due both to the nature of categories and to the myriad developments, orientations and approaches within feminism. Although understanding and analyzing the political effects of gendered contexts is an important field of feminist political theory, feminist theory, and hence feminist political theory, is about more than gender. Feminist political theorists are found throughout the academy, in departments of political science, history, women’s studies, sociology, geography, anthropology, religion, and philosophy.

Feminist political theory encompasses a broad scope of approaches. It overlaps with related areas including feminist jurisprudence/feminist legal theory; feminist political philosophy; ecological feminism; female-centered empirical research in political science; and feminist research methods (feminist method) for use in political science the social sciences.

What frequently distinguishes feminist political theory from feminism broadly is the specific examination of the state and its role in the reproduction or redressing of gender inequality.  In addition to being broad and multidisciplinary, the field is relatively new, inherently innovative, and still expanding; the Stanford Encyclopedia of Philosophy explains that "feminist political philosophy serves as a field for developing new ideals, practices, and justifications for how political institutions and practices should be organized and reconstructed."

History

Pre-History 
The earliest origins of feminist political theory can be traced back into texts written by women about women’s abilities and their protesting about women’s exclusion and subordination.

Some key primary texts include: 

Christiane de Pizan's 1450 "The Book of the City of Ladies", which was written in praise of women and as a defense of their capabilities and virtues in order to combat against misogynist male writing.

Mary Astell's 1694 "A Serious Proposal to the Ladies, for the Advancement of Their True and Greatest Interest," argues that women who do not intend to marry should use their dowries to finance residential women's colleges to provide the recommended education for upper- and middle-class women.

Olympe de Gouges's 1791 "Declaration of the Rights of Woman and the Female Citizen", which stated that women, like their male counterparts, have natural, inalienable, and sacred rights.

Mary Wollstonecraft's 1792 "A Vindication of the Rights of Woman", which argues that the educational system deliberately trained women to be frivolous and incapable and that if girls were allowed the same advantages as boys, women would be not only exceptional wives and mothers but also capable workers.

Charlotte Perkins Gilman's 1898 "Women and Economics", which argues that the economic independence and specialization of women is essential to the improvement of marriage. 

Virginia Woolf, A Room of One’s Own, argues that every woman needs a room of her own, a luxury that  men are able to enjoy without question, in order have the time and the space to engage in uninterrupted writing time. 

Simone de Beauvoir's "The Second Sex", which exposed the power dynamics surrounding womanhood and laid the foundation for subsequent feminist theories exposing women's social subjugation.

Women's Rights Movement (1800s - early 1900s) 
Women's involvement in the women's right movement began mostly as a part of the international movement to abolish slavery. During this, the women participating sought equal political rights with men, namely the right to vote. They also countered the societal norms of women as being weak, irrational and unable to participate in politics by arguing  against the cult of domesticity that women were entitled to the same civil and political rights. Furthermore, the members of the suffrage movement worked for women’s rights to divorce, rights to inheritance, rights to matriculate into colleges and universities, and more.

Women's Liberation Movement (1960s -1970s) 
Feminist political theory as a term only consolidated in the West during Women's liberation movement of the 1960s and 70s. 

The women's liberation movement was a collective struggle for equality during the late 1960s and 1970s. This movement, which consisted of women's liberation groups, advocacy, protests, consciousness-raising, and feminist theory, sought to free women from oppression and male supremacy.

Several distinct stages of feminism that arose from this movement are explained below.

Radical feminism 
Radical feminism argues that at the heart of women’s oppression is pervasive male domination, which is built into the conceptual and social architecture of modern patriarchal societies. Men dominate women not just through violence and exclusion but also through language. Thus came to be Catharine A. MacKinnon's famous line, “Man fucks woman; subject verb object.” Radical feminists argue that, because of patriarchy, women have come to be viewed as the "other" to the male norm, and as such have been systematically oppressed and marginalized.

Early radical feminism was grounded in the rejection of the nuclear family and femininity as constructed within heterosexuality. The strongest forms of radical feminism argue that there can be no reform, but only recreation of the notions of family, partnership, and childrearing, and that to do so in a way that preserves women’s dignity requires the creation of women-only spaces.

Liberal feminism 
Liberal feminism argues that the central aims of liberal theory: freedom, equality, universal human rights and justice are also the proper aims of feminist theory. Its primary focus is to achieve gender equality through political and legal reform within the framework of liberal democracy.

Liberal feminists use figures and concepts from the liberal tradition to develop feminist institutions and political analyses. They suggest that emancipating women requires that  women be treated and recognized as equal, rights bearing human agents. A common theme of liberal feminism is an emphasis on equal opportunity via fair opportunity and equal political rights.

Marxist and socialist feminism 
Marxist feminism is a philosophical variant of feminism that incorporates and extends Marxist theory. It recognizes that women are oppressed and attributes the oppression to capitalism and the individual ownership of private property. Thus they insist that the only way to end the oppression of women and achieve the women's liberation is to overthrow the capitalist system in which they contend much of women's labor is uncompensated.

Socialist feminism is the result of Marxism meeting radical feminism. Socialist feminists consider how sexism and the gendered division of labor of each historical era is determined by the economic system of the time, largely expressed through capitalist and patriarchal relations. They believe that women's liberation must be sought in conjunction with the social and economic justice of all people and see the fight to end male supremacy as key to social justice.

Ecological feminism 
Ecological feminism is branch of feminism that examines the connections between women and nature. Connections between environment and gender can be made by looking at the gender division of labor and environmental roles rather than an inherent connection with nature. The gender division of labor requires a more nurturing and caring role for women, therefore that caring nature places women closer with the environment.

In the 1970s, the impacts of post-World War II technological development led many women to organize against issues from the toxic pollution of neighborhoods to nuclear weapons testing on indigenous lands. This grassroots activism emerging across every continent was both intersectional and cross-cultural in its struggle to protect the conditions for reproduction of Life on Earth.

Postmodernist/Poststructuralist feminism 
Postmodernist feminism rejects the dualisms of the previous 20 years of feminist theory: man/woman, reason/emotion, difference/equality. It challenges the very notion of stable categories of sex, gender, race or sexuality. Postmodernist feminists agree with others that gender is the most important identity, however what makes Postmodern feminists different is that they are interested in how people 'pick and mix' their identities. They are also interested in the topic of masculinity, and instead reject the stereotypical aspects of feminism, embracing it as a positive aspect of identity. One of their key goals is to disable the patriarchal norms that have led to gender inequality.

Topics of inquiry

Feminist epistemology 
A key aspect of feminist political theory/philosophy is feminist epistemology. Feminist epistemologists question the objectivity of social and philosophical sciences by contending that standards of authority and credibility are socially constructed and thus reflect and re-entrench the sociopolitical status quo. It studies the ways in which gender influences our conceptions of knowledge and practices of inquiry and justification and identifies how dominant conceptions and practices of knowledge attribution, acquisition, and justification disadvantage women, and thus strives to reform them.

Feminist epistemologists argue that the current dominant knowledge practices disadvantage women by 

 excluding them from inquiry
 denying them epistemic authority
 denigrating “feminine” cognitive styles
 producing theories of women that represent them as inferior, or significant only in the ways they serve male interests
 producing theories of social phenomena that render women’s activities and interests, or gendered power relations, invisible
 producing knowledge that is not useful for people in subordinate positions, or that reinforces gender and other social hierarchies.

Gendered political institutions 
Political theory on the gendering of institutions explores questions such what does it mean for an institution to be “gendered," how can one evaluate whether an institution is gendered, and what are the consequences of gendered institutions for the people who work within them. An example of such related scholarship is Eileen McDonagh's book The Motherless State which explores how socially feminized "motherly" attributes have been stripped from modern governance models. An exploration of the history of patriarchy is central to understanding how political institutions have become gendered and the impact this has on feminist political theory. The importance of understanding patriarchy historically is explored in Judith M. Bennet's book 'History Matter: Patriarchy and the Challenge of Feminism'. A definition of patriarchy is provided by Sylvia Walby in her book 'Theorising patriarchy'. This shows how patriarchal systems have historically caused the oppression of women and the male domination of politics.

Group identity/identity politics 
Theorists studying this aspect of feminist political theory question the construction of women as an identity group. On a basic level, they consider whether it is even possible to come to some sort of conclusion about a "women" group’s relation to politics. One facet of the debate involves intersectionality and whether women from different racial and cultural backgrounds have enough in common to form a political group. Intersectionality  arguments claim that the multifaceted connection between race, gender, and other systems that work together to oppress while allowing privilege are vital and must be considered in the political sphere. Another facet questions whether transgender women should be included in the group "women" insofar as they lack many of the experiences of girlhood and womanhood which bind "women" together as a distinct group. This topic also includes redefining "groupness;" for example, Iris Marion Young has suggested women are more of a "seriality" rather than a group insofar as they undergo similar experiences but in isolation of each other, lacking a sense of group identity.

Political leadership and gender 
This field addresses how women lead differently than their male counterparts in political careers, such as legislators, executives, and judges. Some scholars in this field study how political leadership is itself masculinized to exclude the kinds of political leadership women most frequently provide, often outside of formal offices. For example, Hardy-Fanta looks at grassroots political work in Latino communities in the U.S. to identify feminized political leadership roles, ultimately concluding that Latina women provide the most critical leadership and work in those communities—despite the fact that most studies overlook their leadership because it does  not occur within formal officeholding roles.

See also

Related journals 
 Politics & Gender
 Signs
 Feminist Theory
 International Feminist Journal of Politics

References

External links 
 Feminist Political Philosophy (Stanford Encyclopedia of Philosophy)

Political science
Politics